This is a list of Sri Lankan Test cricketers.

A Test match is an international cricket match between two representative teams that are full members of the International Cricket Council (ICC). Both teams have two innings, and the match lasts up to five days.

The list is arranged in the order in which each player won his first Test cap. Where more than one player won his first Test cap in the same match, those players are listed alphabetically by surname.

List of Test cricketers

Statistics are correct as of 17 March 2023.

See also
 Test cricket
 Sri Lanka national cricket team
 List of Sri Lanka ODI cricketers
 List of Sri Lanka Twenty20 International cricketers

Notes

References

External links
 Cricinfo
 Howstat

Test
Sri Lanka